Wolf Kaiser (26 October 1916 – 22 October 1992) was a German theatre and film actor. He grew up in Switzerland, where he studied chemistry and physiology. In 1937 he was deemed unfit for service in the Wehrmacht, and then went to Berlin where he trained as an actor.

Career
Kaiser made his stage début in 1941 at the Stadtheater in Jihlava, Czechoslovakia, when that country was occupied by Germany. This led to Kaiser's engagement at the Volksbühne in Berlin from 1942 until 1945. Kaiser then had engagements in Frankfurt am Main, Munich and the Schauspiel Leipzig. In 1950 Kaiser returned to Berlin, where Bertolt Brecht recruited him to the Deutsches Theater and the Berliner Ensemble. Kaiser starred as Mack the Knife in Brecht and Weill's The Threepenny Opera in more than 450 times. Kaiser stayed with the Berliner Ensemble until 1967, becoming one of East Germany's foremost stage actors.

Kaiser had acted in films since the Second World War, including roles in Wolfgang Staudte's Die Geschichte vom kleinen Muck (1953), Kurt Maetzig's Ernst Thälmann, Sohn Seiner Klasse (1954), Martin Hellberg's Thomas Müntzer and Peter Palitzsch and Manfred Wekwerth's film of Brecht's play, Mutter Courage und ihre Kinder (1961). Kaiser's first starring role was in 1956 in Hellberg's Die Millionen der Yvette, and he was noted for his roles in Helmut Spieß's 1956 film version of The Valiant Little Tailor, Martin Hellberg's 1959 film version of Friedrich Schiller's Intrigue and Love and Robert Vernay's 1965 film Das Stacheltier – Das blaue Zimmer. From 1969 Kaiser concentrated his career on screen acting, including Peter Zadek's 1973 version of Kleiner Mann – was nun? and Egon Günther's 1978 television version of Ursula. Kaiser's last major film role was in 1981 as Casanova in Martin Eckermann's Casanova auf Schloß Dux. Kaiser appeared frequently on East German television.

Death

Kaiser believed in and supported the East German Communist state. He was distressed at its collapse in 1989, its corruption that came to light after its fall and German reunification, and the return of capitalism and mass unemployment to eastern Germany from 1989 onwards. In 1992, a few days before his birthday, Kaiser committed suicide by leaping out of the study window of his apartment. Kaiser is buried in the Dorotheenstadt and Friedrichswerder Cemetery in Berlin.

Awards
1961: Art Prize of the German Democratic Republic
1965: National Prize of East Germany 2nd Class
1967: National Prize of East Germany 3rd Class for collaboration in Geduld der Kühnen
1968: National Prize of East Germany 1st Class for collaboration in Zeit ist Glück
1977: Fatherland Service Order in Silver
1981: Fatherland Service Order in Gold

Selected filmography
 The Last Year (1951)
 Intrigue and Love (1959)

References

1916 births
1992 deaths
Actors from Frankfurt
People from Hesse-Nassau
German communists
German male stage actors
German male film actors
East German actors
Recipients of the Patriotic Order of Merit (honor clasp)
Recipients of the National Prize of East Germany
Recipients of the Art Prize of the German Democratic Republic
Suicides by jumping in Germany
German male television actors
20th-century German male actors
1992 suicides
German expatriates in Switzerland